Jubilee is a Big Finish Productions audio drama based on the long-running British science fiction television series Doctor Who. Elements of the story were reworked by Rob Shearman and darker elements removed to create the television episode "Dalek" in the 2005 series.

Plot
The Sixth Doctor and Evelyn, having followed a weird transmission, arrives in London in 2003, but they quickly notice that the city appears strange and looks unusually dirty and dusty. Before they can properly investigate, the TARDIS suddenly flees in terror and leaves them behind. The Doctor is then suddenly stricken by a weird sense of deja vu, and realizes that he and Evelyn have landed in an alternate timeline. England, now known as the "English Empire", has become the central political power of the world, following the events "The Great Dalek War of 1903", and is ruled by the despotic President Rochester, who holds the sole surviving Dalek in the universe as a captive, and uses it as a part of his propaganda campaign of death.

As the Doctor and Evelyn try to restore the original timeline, they discover that they are being worshipped as heroes of the Dalek war, a fact which worries the Doctor, as he suddenly has faint and rather out-of-place memories of having fought in that war, and perhaps even more disturbingly, he can't recall if he ever managed to escape from it.

Cast
The Doctor — Colin Baker
Evelyn Smythe — Maggie Stables
Miriam Rochester — Rosalind Ayres
Dalek Voices — Nicholas Briggs
Female Movie Star — Georgina Carter
Farrow — Steven Elder
Male Movie Star — Jack Galagher
Nigel Rochester — Martin Jarvis
Lamb — Kai Simmons

Trivia
In a planned homage to this story, boxes from a chain called Jubilee Pizza were supposed to have been seen in the background in the television episode it inspired, "Dalek", but the scene was cut. The pizza chain finally appeared in the premiere episode of Torchwood, "Everything Changes".
Before the beginning of Part 1, a fake movie trailer for Daleks: The Ultimate Adventure plays, with the Doctor portrayed as a dashing hero, Evelyn is portrayed as a young, sultry companion, and the Daleks are heard doing some very un-Dalek like things (such as laughing evilly and shouting 'Scamper!' when the Doctor appears). The trailer is set within the parallel Earth featured in this story.
Martin Jarvis (Nigel Rochester) and Rosalind Ayres (Miriam Rochester) are married in real life.
The Sixth Doctor and Evelyn previously visited (and were imprisoned in) the Tower of London in The Marian Conspiracy.
This isn't the first time the Sixth Doctor has found a statue of himself. In the television serial Revelation of the Daleks the statue that he and Peri find collapses on him.
 The story involves Doctor visiting an alternate, dystopian timeline. He previously visited an alternate timeline in his third incarnation during the events of Inferno.

References

External links
Big Finish Productions – Jubilee

2003 audio plays
Sixth Doctor audio plays
Dalek audio plays
Audio plays by Robert Shearman
Fiction set in 2003
Black comedy